Zipair, officially , is a Japanese low-cost airline headquartered on the grounds of Tokyo Narita Airport. Initially founded in 2018, the airline is a wholly owned subsidiary of Japan Airlines, from which it leases its fleet of Boeing 787 Dreamliner aircraft. Operations launched on June 3, 2020 as a cargo-only airline due to restrictions on passenger traffic related to the COVID-19 pandemic, and passenger operations launched on October 16, 2020.

History 
It was estimated that the airline would commence operation in time for the 2020 Summer Olympics.

In March 2019, the brand of the new carrier was named Zipair, referencing the words "Zip", which represents speed, and "ZIP Code". Subsequently, T.B.L. was renamed "Zipair Tokyo Inc." Zipair's planned operations consisted of international flights from Narita International Airport to Bangkok and Seoul, launching on May 14 and July 1, 2020, respectively with Boeing 787-8 aircraft transferred from JAL. The airline planned to launch additional destinations in Asia, while flights to the United States were planned to be added by 2021.

In early 2020, the impact of the COVID-19 pandemic on aviation disrupted Zipair's plans for its launch of operations, with Thailand banning all incoming passenger flights from April 4, 2020, and the Japanese government introducing strict border enforcement measures. Under these circumstances, Zipair announced on April 9, 2020 that its launch of service would be postponed until further notice, although later that month the airline applied with the US Department of Transportation for the operation of a route to Honolulu to begin on October 25, 2020. On May 21, 2020, it was announced that the airline had submitted an application to the Japanese authority for the launch of cargo flights between Tokyo and Bangkok to meet the needs for air cargo during the suspension of passenger flights. Zipair proceeded to launch services on June 3, 2020, initially as a cargo airline, with its fleet of Boeing 787-8 aircraft.

Following its launch as a cargo-only airline, Zipair inaugurated its passenger services on October 16, 2020. The following month, on November 20, 2020, the airline announced the details of its first route to the United States, with flights between Tokyo Narita and Honolulu launching on December 19, 2020. On July 20, 2021, the airline announced a new service between Tokyo Narita and Singapore, with flights launching on September 7, 2021. On October 28, 2021, the airline added a third aircraft to its fleet with a Boeing 787-8 transferred from Japan Airlines. On November 12, 2021, the airline announced a new service between Tokyo Narita and Los Angeles International Airport to begin on December 25, 2021.

In June 2022, Zipair announced that the large letter Z on the tailfin of its livery would be replaced with a green geometric pattern to avoid misunderstandings, as the letter has been used as a military symbol by Russian Armed Forces involved in the 2022 Russian invasion of Ukraine. Also in June 2022, the airline announced a new service between Tokyo Narita and San Jose International Airport to launch during December 2022, before subsequently specifying December 12, 2022 as the launch date for the service.

On February 21, 2023, Zipair announced plans to begin services to San Francisco and Manila during the year, as well as to increase its fleet to seven aircraft.

Destinations 
, Zipair operates to the following destinations:

Fleet 

, the Zipair fleet consists of the following aircraft:

See also 
 List of low-cost airlines in Japan

Notes

References

External links 

Zipair 
Zipair Tokyo 

Airlines of Japan
Japan Airlines
Airlines established in 2019
Airline companies based in Tokyo
Low-cost carriers
Japanese companies established in 2019